Liet International, formerly Liet-Lávlut, is an international music competition for songs in European minority and regional languages. The inaugural edition took place on 28 April 2002 as a spin-off of the West Frisian-language song contest , held annually in Leeuwarden, Netherlands since 1991.

Since 2006, Liet International has been held in a different city each year. The 2006 and 2008 editions, held in the Swedish part of Sápmi, were titled Liet-Lávlut ( is Northern Sami for 'sing'). The contest was cancelled in 2007 and 2013 when the hosting organisations, in Narbonne and Corsica respectively, backed out at a late stage, and in 2020, due to the COVID-19 pandemic. No Liet International was held in 2005, 2015, 2016, 2019 or 2021.

Due to its similarities to the Eurovision Song Contest, the competition has been dubbed the 'Eurovision of minority languages'. It has been organised under the auspices of the Council of Europe since 2008.

Overview

Past editions

2002 
Both the jury and public awards were won by the Catalan band  with the song "".

2003 
The second Liet International contest was again held at De Harmonie in Leeuwarden, Netherlands, on 23 November 2003. Transjoik, a Sámi group from Norway, won the jury award with the song "Mijjajaa". The public award was won by Welsh-Cornish singer Gwenno Saunders with the song "Vodya".

2004 
The third edition of the contest was held on 22 October 2004. The venue was once again De Harmonie in Leeuwarden, Netherlands. Sámi singer Niko Valkeapää won both the jury and the public award with the song "Rabas mielain". This was the second time in a row that the contest was won by the Sámi entry.

2006 
Since Sápmi had won two out of the three competitions, the fourth edition was held in Östersund, Sweden. Sixty competitors, singing in twenty-five minority languages, took part in the preliminary elimination round. Eleven songs, representing eleven languages, were selected for the final competition.

Although the winner was selected by a jury, the audience could also vote for their favourite entry via text messages and online voting. The Sámi duo Johan Kitti and Ellen Sara Bæhr won the competition with "Luđiin muitalan", sung in Northern Sámi. The public award was won by Liza Pannetier with the Occitan song "Soleu Rouge".

2008 
Liet-Lávlut 2008, the fifth edition of the contest, took place on 18 October 2008 at Kulturens hus in Luleå, Sweden. Corsican singer Jacques Culioli won both the jury and public award with the song "Hosanna in excelsis".

2009 
In January 2009, the board of the Liet Foundation decided to continue under the name Liet International. The sixth edition of the contest was held on 31 October 2009, returning to the De Harmonie theatre in Leeuwarden, Netherlands. The Finnish Sámi rock band Somby won the competition with the song "Ii iđit vel", sung in Northern Sámi. The public award was won by  Dr. Drer & CRC posse from Sardinia, with the song "Apu biu".

2010 
In 2010, Liet International was held in the Breton city of Lorient, France. The contest was won by the Faroese band Orka with the song "Rúmdardrongurin". The public award went to the Friulian band R.esistence in Dub with the song "Fieste".

2011 
The eighth Liet International was held on 19 November 2011 at the Teatro Giovanni da Udine in Udine, Italy, the historical capital of the region of Friuli. The West Frisian singer Janna Eijer won the jury award with the song "Ien klap", while the band Coffeeshock Company from Austria won the public vote with "Gusla mi se je znicila", sung in Burgenland Croatian.

2012 
The ninth edition of Liet International was held on 1 December 2012 at the Teatru de la Llaboral in Gijón, Asturias, Spain. Welsh-born Breton singer Lleuwen won the jury award with the song "Ar Gouloù Bev", while the public award went to Asturiana Mining Company with "Si nun conoces Vaḷḷouta".

2014 
The tenth Liet International song contest was held on 12 December 2014 in Oldenburg, Lower Saxony, Germany. Italian singer Martina Iori won the jury award with the song "Via con mia mùsega", sung in Ladin. In this year, the audience award was replaced by a musicians' award voted on by the contestants themselves. The musicians' award was won by Aila-duo from Finland with the song "Naharij kandâ", sung in Inari Sámi.

2017 
The eleventh Liet International song contest was scheduled to be held in late 2016 in Kautokeino, Norway, the home of the Sámi Grand Prix. However, due to a lack of funds, the contest was postponed to 13 April 2017 and was held as part of the Sámi Easter Festival. For a second time in the history of the contest, a local singer, Ella Marie Hætta Isaksen,  won the contest with her song "Luoddaearru". She also won the musicians' award.

2018 
The twelfth Liet International song contest was held on 23 May 2018 at the Neushoorn in Leeuwarden, Netherlands, as part of the European Capital of Culture activities. The Rowan Tree won the jury award with the song "Tresor", sung in Cornish. The musicians' award was won by Galician singer Nastasia Zürcher with the song "Espertos".

2020 
The thirteenth Liet International contest was due to be held on 3 and 4 April 2020 in Aabenraa, Denmark, but was cancelled due to the COVID-19 pandemic. A full list of participating acts had been released prior to the cancellation. It was decided that a non-competitive, online replacement show, entitled Liet International 2020+1, would be held on 8 October 2021 to celebrate the acts due to compete in the 2020 contest. Ten out of the twenty acts participated in Liet International 2020+1.

2022 
The thirteenth Liet International contest was held on 13 May 2022 at the Schweizerhalle in Tønder, Denmark. There were 13 competing entries, and the show was hosted by Stefanie Pia Wright and Niklas Freiberg Nissen. It featured the first competitive entries in South Jutlandic, Southern Schleswig Danish, and South Tyrolean German, as well as the first entry in North Frisian since the inaugural contest in 2002. It was the first contest since 2008 to not feature an entry from Scotland, and the first competitive edition to not feature a submission from the United Kingdom. 

Initially, the Russian band Jura were due to compete with the song "Takhetle konum" in the Tatar language, but they withdrew due to the 2022 Russian invasion of Ukraine. In their place, Israeli band Sofi and the Baladis competed with the song "Rebutalla", marking both the first time Israel was represented by an entry, the first entry from a country in the Middle East and the first entry in Hebrew, as well as the third entry from a non-European country (the first two being the entries representing Suriname). Early announcements also listed the Cornish band Brother Sea with the song "Trodhydhyek" as a participant, while the final listing contained Billy Fumey with "U Port Titi" instead.

The jury award was won by Corsican singer Doria Ousset with the song "Roma". The audience award was won by Sardinian singer Emanuele Pintus with the song "Genia".

Regional selections
The majority of Liet International contestants are chosen from applying artists by a selection committee. In addition, entries may be selected through regional song contests. Regional song contests that have served as a preselection for Liet International include:

  (West Frisian; 2002–present)
 Sámi Grand Prix (Sámi languages; 2006–present)
 Nòs Ùr (Celtic languages and Scots; 2008–2009)
  (Galician; 2008)
  (minority languages of the Nordics and Eastern Europe; 2008)
  (Asturian; 2009–2014)
  (minority languages of the Alps and Mediterranean; 2009–2014)
 Romansh Song Contest (Romansh; 2011)
 Liet Corsica (Corsican; 2012)

Selected entries

Language history 
A total of fifty-seven languages have been represented at the contest at least once (counting the canceled 2020 edition). West Frisian is the only language to have appeared at every contest, as well as one of only two to have been represented by two different entries at the same contest (the other being Galician, and both occurred at the 2018 contest). Scotland is the only region to be represented by two languages at the same contest, once again at the 2018 contest (Scottish Gaelic and Scots). The only non-European language to have appeared at the contest is Sranan Tongo. The Netherlands and the United Kingdom have participated the most, with regional entries in all 13 contests, while France and Spain have only missed one each. Languages representing Belgium, Estonia, Hungary, Israel, Latvia, Luxembourg, Poland, Portugal, and Romania have each only appeared once. Russia is the country with the most regional languages featured at the contest, totaling eight. Although many languages featured at the contest are recognized national or regional languages within their countries, only three featured languages (Hebrew, Irish, and Luxembourgish) are considered their countries' official or co-official language.

References

External links
 

2002 establishments in the Netherlands
Recurring events established in 2002
Folk festivals
Song contests